Jeunesse Populaire Française (JPF, English: French Popular Youth) was a fascist youth movement created by Jacques Doriot and connected to his Parti Populaire Français. They wore a blue uniform. They are remembered for their fights with zazous and Jews and shaving heads of zazous.

It was established in October 1941 under the name l'Union de la Jeunesse Populaire Française (L'UJPF, The Union Of The French Popular Youth) and renamed to JPF in May 1942 when it merged with other smaller youth organizations.

Doriot was its honorary president, the actual one being Roger Vauquelin des Yveteaux (real name: des Yvetots).

See also
Parti Populaire Français

References

Youth wings of political parties in France
Youth organizations established in 1941
1941 establishments in France
Organizations disestablished in 1942
1942 disestablishments in France
Far-right movements in Europe